Thita philippinensis is a species of beetle in the family Cerambycidae. It was described by Stephan von Breuning in 1973.

References

Pteropliini
Beetles described in 1973